Cebiche de tiburón is a 2017 Peruvian adventure comedy film directed by Argentinean Daniel Winitsky.

Synopsis 
Cebiche de tiburón tells the story of an aspiring cook named Pato (Manuel Gold) who, following the crazy suggestions of two sorcerers (charlatans, healers), decides to participate and win the National Cooking Contest with a secret recipe that they recommend. Within the recipe, he publicly commits himself to go down to the bottom of the sea in person, find a sleepy shark, wake him up, and make ceviche. The result is an adventure that he never thought he would live, but he will not do it alone, Pato will experience these situations in the company of Gato (César Ritter), an unemployed salesman and childhood friend. Together they must overcome their fears, face enemies, reach a remote part of the Pacific Ocean and dive without a cage inside a shoal of sharks.

Cast 

 Manuel Gold as Pato
 César Ritter as Gato
 Wendy Ramos as Cascabel
 Sergio Galliani as Toyo Gordo
 Francisca Aronsson as Chinchis

References

External links 

 

2017 films
2010s Spanish-language films

2017 comedy films
Peruvian adventure comedy films
2010s Peruvian films
2010s adventure comedy films
Films about fishers
Films about fishing
Films about food and drink